Andrea Bezzola (19 April 1840, in Zernez – 10 January 1897, in Zürich) was a Swiss jurist, politician and President of the Swiss National Council (1885/1886).

External links 
 
 

1840 births
1897 deaths
People from Inn District, Switzerland
Swiss Calvinist and Reformed Christians
Free Democratic Party of Switzerland politicians
Members of the Council of States (Switzerland)
Members of the National Council (Switzerland)
Presidents of the National Council (Switzerland)